The Mudikondan River is a tributary of the Kaveri River. It branches out from the Kaveri near Papanasam and runs for about  before joining the Tirumalarajanar River near the town of Mudikondan in Tiruvarur district.

Rivers of Tamil Nadu
Rivers of India